Karwal is a sub branch of Sisodiya, Rajput, Aheria branch of the Kshtriya community in Rajasthan. Sparsely found in Rajasthan, Haryana, Uttar Pradesh. The 2011 Census of India for Rajasthan showed the Karwal population as 7183.

References

Scheduled Castes of Uttar Pradesh